Radio Magic is a 1927 German silent comedy film directed by Richard Oswald and starring Werner Krauss, Xenia Desni, and Fern Andra. The film's art direction was by Gustav A. Knauer and Willy Schiller. It premiered on 30 September 1927. The runtime is 60 minutes.

Cast

References

Bibliography

External links
 

1927 films
Films of the Weimar Republic
1927 comedy films
German silent feature films
German comedy films
Films directed by Richard Oswald
German black-and-white films
Silent comedy films
1920s German films